Barbara Wieck (born 26 February 1951) is a German middle-distance runner. She competed in the women's 800 metres at the 1968 Summer Olympics.

References

External links
 

1951 births
Living people
Athletes (track and field) at the 1968 Summer Olympics
German female middle-distance runners
Olympic athletes of East Germany
Place of birth missing (living people)
20th-century German women